The Nuzhat al-Qulub (also spelled Nozhat al-Qolub; , "Hearts' Bliss") is a Persian geographical treatise written in the 1340s by Hamdallah Mustawfi. It is the earliest surviving work to have a map focused on Iran.

Background 
The date when Hamdallah Mustawfi completed the book is uncertain. According to Charles P. Melville, it was completed in 1344; A. C. S. Peacock says that it was completed "no later than 1340";; Nadja Danilenko says that it was completed 1340; Peter Jackson says that it was completed in 1340 or soon afterwards; Linda Komaroff says that it was probably completed in the 1340s.

The Nuzhat al-Qulub is considered Mustawfi's most prominent work and is virtually the only source to describe the geography and affairs of the Mongol Ilkhanid Empire. The source gives vital information about the government, commerce, economic life, sectarian conflicts, tax-collection and other similar topics. Just like his previous works of Tarikh-i guzida and Zafarnamah, Mustawfi rejects to have expertise in the field, and states that he was encouraged by his friends to write the work. He also thought that an available source in Persian would be helpful, due to most geographical sources about Iran being in Arabic (such as the works of Abu Zayd al-Balkhi and Ibn Khordadbeh).

Contents 
The work is also considered a substantial contribution to the ethno-national history of Iran. Mustawfi notably uses the term "Iran" in his work. Since the fall of the Iranian Sasanian Empire in 651, the idea of Iran or Iranzamin ("the land of Iran") as a political entity had disappeared. However, it did remain as an element of the national sentiment of the Iranians, and was occasionally mentioned in the works of other people. With the advent of the Ilkhanate, the idea experienced a resurgence. According to the modern historian Peter Jackson (2017), the reason behind this resurgence was the fall of the Abbasid Caliphate in 1258 and the "relative disenfranchisement of political Islam." Furthermore, by using this term, Mustawfi also portrayed the Ilkhanate as successors of the Sasanians.

Mustawfi describes the borders of Iran extending from the Indus River to Khwarazm and Transoxiana in the east to Byzantium and Syria in the west, corresponding to the territory of the Sasanian Empire. He defines the provinces of Iran in 20 chapters; Iraq ("Arab Iraq") or the "heart of Iranshahr", Persian Iraq, Arran, Mughan, Shirvan, Georgia, Byzantium, Armenia, Rabi'a, Kurdistan, Khuzestan, Fars, Shabankara, Kirman, Mukran, Hormuz, Nimruz, Khorasan, Mazandaran, Qumis, Tabaristan and Gilan. This way of conceptualizing the history and geography of Iran has been emulated by other historians since the 13th-century.

References

Sources 

 
  
 
 
  
 
 
 
 
 
 

15th-century manuscripts
Atlases
15th-century books
Persian literature